Carl Albert State College (CASC) is a community college in southeastern Oklahoma. Originally named Poteau Junior College, it was founded in 1933, and its name changed to Poteau Community College in the early 1950s. In 1971, it was renamed in honor of then Speaker of the House Carl Albert. Its primary campus is located in Poteau, Oklahoma, but has a smaller campus in Sallisaw, Oklahoma. It enrolls approximately 2,400 students annually with a student-faculty ratio of about 22–1.

Academics
Carl Albert State College offers over 28 different academic degree programs, both terminal and transfer. The programs include: Business Administration, Digital Media Technology, Child Development,  Criminal Justice, Mathematics, Pre-Engineering, Pre-Medicine, Nursing (from which program graduates may qualify to become Registered Nurses), Physical Therapist Assistant, and others. Many degree programs may be completed 100% online through the extensive web offerings.

Student life
There are eight dormitories and over 31 student-run organizations. Students are given free high speed internet access as well as free access to the school's computer Lab

Athletics
The school's sports teams are called the Vikings. The mascot had been the Trojans for some time until the early 1990s when the switch was made. The school engages in collegiate baseball, softball, wrestling, cross country, and e-sports.

See also
 Carl Albert
 Community college
 Eastern Oklahoma State College
 Heavener Runestone
 List of colleges and universities in Oklahoma
 Murray State College
 Poteau, Oklahoma

External links
Official website
 Encyclopedia of Oklahoma History and Culture - Carl Albert State College

OK Cooperative Alliance
Educational institutions established in 1933
Education in Le Flore County, Oklahoma
Education in Sequoyah County, Oklahoma
Buildings and structures in Le Flore County, Oklahoma
Buildings and structures in Sequoyah County, Oklahoma
1933 establishments in Oklahoma
Community colleges in Oklahoma
NJCAA athletics